Ysaline Bonaventure and Demi Schuurs were the defending champions, but Bonaventure chose not to participate this year. Schuurs played alongside Oksana Kalashnikova, but lost in the quarterfinals to Valentyna Ivakhnenko and Marina Melnikova.
Eri Hozumi and Miyu Kato won the title, defeating Ivakhnenko and Melnikova in the final, 3–6, 7–5, [10–8].

Seeds

Draw

References 
 Draw

Katowice Doubles
Katowice Open